Lucy Scott (born 19 January 1971) is a British actress.  She is known for playing Charlotte Lucas in the 1995 BBC production Pride and Prejudice.

Career
Lucy Scott has worked as an actress, in film and television since the early 1990s. She trained at the Central School of Speech & Drama.  Her stage credits include Emma at the Tricycle Theatre, London, as part of a seven-person ensemble cast; Search and Destroy, as Mary, at the New End Theatre in Hampstead, London; and as Nikki in Things We Do For Love.

She also appeared in an episode of comedy show Modern Toss.

As well as acting, Scott worked as a script supervisor on the first episode of Popetown, called The Double.

Select credits
 Spooks
 Episode #5.9 as Librarian (2006)
 Rosemary & Thyme
 Seeds of Time as Caroline Pargeter (2006)
 Tom Brown's Schooldays as Mrs Frances Arthur (2005)
 Perks as Alex Wright (2003)
 The Inspector Lynley Mysteries
 For the Sake of Elena as Bernadette (2002)
 Pride and Prejudice as Charlotte Lucas (1995)
 Micky Love as Martin's secretary (1993)

References

External links
 

English film actresses
English television actresses
1971 births
Living people
20th-century English actresses
21st-century English actresses
English stage actresses